Wolfenstein is a first-person shooter video game developed by Raven Software and published by Activision, part of the Wolfenstein video game series. It serves as a loose sequel to the 2001 entry Return to Castle Wolfenstein, and uses an enhanced version of id Software's id Tech 4. The game was released in August 2009 for Microsoft Windows, PlayStation 3 and Xbox 360.

Wolfenstein received lukewarm to positive reception by critics and suffered from poor commercial sales; selling a combined 100,000 copies within its first month. It would be the final game id Software oversaw as an independent developer, released two months after their acquisition by ZeniMax Media in June 2009. The game would be loosely succeeded by Wolfenstein: The New Order, released on May 20, 2014.

Plot and setting

The story is set in the fictional town of Isenstadt during World War II, which the Nazis have enforced martial law in order to excavate rare Nachtsonne crystals necessary to access the "Black Sun" dimension. As the game progresses, happenings in Isenstadt become stranger (military patrols are replaced by supernatural creatures, etc.). Locations include the town's sewers, a tavern, a hospital, a farm, an underground mining facility, a church, the SS headquarters, a dig site and caverns, a cannery, a radio station, a paranormal base, a general's home, a castle, an airfield and a large zeppelin.

Story
In an introduction sequence, special agent William "B.J." Blazkowicz steals a medallion from a general on the German battleship Tirpitz.  Discovered and captured, he unwittingly unleashes the power of the medallion, which kills all his foes for him.  Hijacking a plane from the Tirpitz, he escapes and returns to the OSA headquarters. During a meeting there, he learns that the medallion needs crystals called Nachtsonne, mined only in a city in Germany called Isenstadt, to make use of its full power. The Nazis have begun digging for crystals, led by a general named Viktor Zetta. He also hands over the medallion to the OSA for further research. Shortly after, Blazkowicz is sent to Isenstadt, but upon arriving by train, his cover is already blown by an unknown informant. He then meets up with agents from the Kreisau Circle, a German resistance group dedicated to fighting the Nazis, and with them, makes it to Isenstadt.

In Isenstadt, he meets the brothers Stefan and Anton Kriege, who run the Black Market where Blazkowicz can upgrade all of his weapons and powers. (He pays for upgrades with gold earned from missions or found scattered throughout the game.) He also meets the leader of the Kreisau Circle, a former schoolteacher named Caroline Becker and her lieutenant Erik Engle. Becker sends Blazkowicz on a mission into a dig site, where he frees a young Russian named Sergei Kovlov. He also finds an exact copy of the medallion that he found on the Nazi warship, which Kovlov calls the Thule Medallion. Kovlov introduces Blazkowicz to the Golden Dawn, a group of scholars who specialize in the occult, founded and led by Dr. Leonid Alexandrov. He also shows Blazkowicz how to use the Thule Medallion. With a crystal provided by Kovlov, Blazkowicz is able to enter the Veil, a barrier between Earth and a dimension known as the Black Sun. In the Veil the player is able to run faster, spot enemies in the dark and walk through doors which have the Black Sun symbol. Using the Veil, he manages to escape. As Blazkowicz completes more missions, he gains new weapons and new defensive and offensive powers for the Thule Medallion: the yellow crystal allows him to slow down time and dodge projectiles, the blue crystal deploys a shield around B.J. which grants him temporal invulnerability, and the red crystal greatly enhances the damage caused by the weapons that he uses. Through his missions he learns that the Nazis try to harness the power of the Black Sun dimension. With it, their goal is to turn the tide in the war against the Allies. Eventually, he manages to confront and kill General Zetta, who turns out to be a monster when viewed through the Veil. The Black Market, the Kreisau Circle, and the Golden Dawn then move to a new location in downtown Isenstadt to escape retaliation for Zetta's death.

Shortly after the move, Caroline Becker is captured and held in a nearby castle. Blazkowicz helps the Kreisau Circle stage a rescue mission. He confronts Zetta's replacement, Obergruppenführer Wilhelm "Deathshead" Strasse, who is eager for revenge after Blazkowicz destroyed his Übersoldat-program in Return to Castle Wolfenstein. During a struggle, Caroline appears to be killed by Hans Grosse, Deathshead's henchman. Upon Blazkowicz's return to Isenstadt, Stefan Kriege informs him that he has killed his brother, Anton, thinking he was the mole and betrayed both Blazkowicz and Caroline. Blazkowicz then finds out that a Nazi superweapon, powered by Black Sun energy, is about to be fired at the city from a zeppelin that has been hovering over the city since Blazkowicz first arrived in Isenstadt. He boards the airship, where he discovers that Dr. Alexandrov was the real traitor all along. Alexandrov's treachery is rewarded only by an execution at the hand of Hans Grosse. In order to prepare the weapon, Deathshead and Grosse enter the Black Sun through a portal that Nazi scientists had excavated and reassembled. Blazkowicz jumps in after them. In the Black Sun, he encounters Hans Grosse guarding the machine that powers Deathshead's superweapon. Grosse greets him in a mechanical suit outfitted with two chainguns (recreating his earlier appearance in Wolfenstein 3D), and a Thule Medallion identical to Blazkowicz's. Blazkowicz kills Grosse by jamming the Nachtsonne crystals from his medallion into Grosse's. He then destroys the machine, but Deathshead flees through the portal before B.J. can capture him. The explosion takes out the portal and destabilizes the zeppelin, effectively destroying all ways of accessing the Black Sun Dimension. B.J. grabs onto a parachute and leaps from the railing. Shortly afterward, the zeppelin falls from the sky and B.J. witnesses as it crashes into the distant castle, severely damaging the castle in a giant series of explosions. In a post-credits cutscene, a wounded Deathshead is seen clambering out of the burning zeppelin and castle debris, screaming in frustration.

Development
Wolfenstein uses an improved version of id Software's id Tech 4 game engine, the technology behind Doom 3 and Enemy Territory: Quake Wars. The game was developed by Raven Software for Windows, PlayStation 3 and Xbox 360. The modifications to the game engine include depth of field effects, soft shadowing, post-processing effects, Havok physics, as well as the addition of a supernatural realm, called the Veil. While in the Veil the player has access to certain special abilities, such as the power to slow down time, to get around obstacles that exist on Earth, or even to be able to defeat enemies that have an otherwise impenetrable shield (similar to "Spirit Walk" from the previous id Tech 4 title Prey). The actress Carrie Coon started her career by doing motion caption work for Wolfenstein. The multiplayer part was developed by Endrant Studios. Wolfenstein is the first in a string of id Software games not planned to have a Linux port (continued on throughout Rage onwards), with the person in charge of Linux ports at id, Timothee Besset, commenting that "It is unlikely the new Wolfenstein title is going to get a native Linux release. None of it was done in house, and I had no involvement in the project."

On the day of Wolfensteins release, a PC patch was released to address several issues with the online multiplayer component. The multiplayer development studio, Endrant Studios, soon laid off some of its workforce after the completion of the development of Wolfensteins multiplayer.

Motion comics
Four promotional motion comics, each about three minutes long, were released. Each was based on a particular installment in the Wolfenstein series and served as a nostalgic reminder. The first one recreated Wolfenstein 3Ds escape from Castle Wolfenstein, the Hans Grosse killing and the final battle against Adolf Hitler. The second was based upon Wolfenstein 3Ds prequel game Spear of Destiny, and recreated its final battle, in which B.J. fights the cybernetic Death Knight and the Angel of Death for control of the Spear. The third comic was based on Return to Castle Wolfenstein and recreated the battle with Olaric, the destruction of an experimental V2 rocket and later the final battle against Heinrich I. The fourth comic was based on the Wolfensteins own cinematic introduction and shows B.J. infiltrating a Nazi battleship and stealing the first Thule medallion.

Reception

The game received "average" reviews on all platforms according to the review aggregation website Metacritic. IGN gave the game a positive review, though Jason Ocampo said of it, "...you can't help but wish that they developed the kernel of ideas in this game into something more. As it is, this new Wolfenstein comes off as an engaging, if otherwise forgettable, shooter."

411Mania gave the Xbox 360 version eight out of ten and said that it "holds up this tradition of mindless fun, although it doesn't do anything revolutionary." The Daily Telegraph gave the PlayStation 3 version seven out of ten and called it "a game that swings wildly in quality on an almost minute-by-minute basis, and a rather vanilla multiplayer offering doesn't do much to quicken the pulse." However, The A.V. Club gave the same console version a C+ and said that the multiplayer "feels jerky and unbalanced." Edge gave the same console version five out of ten and said, "For all its foibles, Raven's brand of brazen, aimless carnage is a gruesome thrill with just enough dynamism in each battle to keep its anachronistic heart beating." Ben "Yahtzee" Croshaw  of Zero Punctuation found the game so dull that he resorted to writing his review in limerick form. Years later, he held the game in a much kinder light when compared to more contemporary shooters such as Call of Duty.

As a result of low sales figures (only 100,000 copies were sold in its first month), Activision laid off employees from Raven Software. The game has been unavailable digitally on Xbox Live, PlayStation Network, or Steam since 2014 for unknown reasons.

References

External links

2009 video games
Activision games
Alternate history video games
Games for Windows certified games
Experimental medical treatments in fiction
Id Software games
Id Tech games
Multiplayer and single-player video games
Multiplayer online games
Nazism in fiction
PlayStation 3 games
Video game reboots
Video games about Nazi Germany
Video games scored by Bill Brown
Video games set in castles
Video games set in Germany
Video games set in psychiatric hospitals
Video games using Havok
Windows games
Wolfenstein
World War II first-person shooters
Xbox 360 games
Video games developed in the United States